= Guido Pulidori =

Italian footballer (born 1997)

Personal information
- Date of birth: 23 March 1997 (age 29)
- Place of birth: Empoli, Italy
- Height: 1.85 m (6 ft 1 in)
- Position: Goalkeeper

Team information
- Current team: Livorno

Senior career*
Years	Team	Apps	(Gls)
2014–2018	Livorno	14	(0)
2016–2017	→ Ligorna (loan)	32	(0)
2018–2019	Catania	0	(0)
2019–2021	Carrarese	10	(0)
2021–	Livorno	0	(0)
- * Club domestic league appearances and goals as of 17:39, 13 October 2021 (UTC)

Guido Pulidori (born 23 March 1997) is an Italian professional footballer who plays for Livorno, as a goalkeeper.

== Club career ==
He spent the 2016–17 season on loan at Serie D club Ligorna.

On 28 August 2018, he signed a two-year contract with the Serie C club Catania.

On 12 July 2019, he moved to Carrarese.

On 7 September 2021, he returned to newly reformed Livorno in Eccellenza.
